The Brown University sailing team is a varsity intercollegiate athletic team of Brown University in Providence, Rhode Island, United States. The team is a member of the New England Intercollegiate Sailing Association, which is part of the Inter-Collegiate Sailing Association.

National championships 
In 1991, Brown University became the first Ivy League University to win the Leonard M. Fowle Trophy for best overall collegiate team.  In addition, Brown has won 7 national championships:
2 Dinghy National Championships (1942 and 1948)
5 Women’s Dinghy National Championships (1985, 1988, 1989, 1998 and 2019)

Sailors 
Ragna Agerup was named Women's College Sailor of the Year in 2019, and Ted Turner was inducted into the America's Cup Hall of Fame in 1993 and the National Sailing Hall of Fame in 2011.

Glen Foster in 1972; Kris Stookey in 1996, Kevin Hall and Katie McDowell in 2004; and Ragna Agerup in 2016, are Olympic sailors from Brown.

Fleet 
The fleet consists of 18 Zim Flying Juniors, 18 LaserPerformance Z420s, 4 Lasers, and a Vanguard 15 and is supported by two motorboats.

Venue 
The home venue of the team is the Ted Turner Sailing Pavilion, located at the Edgewood Yacht Club, approximately 4 miles from campus.

References

External links
Website

Inter-Collegiate Sailing Association teams
Brown Bears sailing